Elizabeth McHutcheson Sinclair (26 April 180016 October 1892) was a Scottish homemaker, farmer, and plantation owner in New Zealand and Hawaii, best known as the matriarch of the Sinclair family that bought the Hawaiian island of Niihau in 1864. Born in Glasgow, Scotland, she married Francis Sinclair, a ship's captain.  With six children in tow, the family moved to New Zealand. Her husband and eldest son (and much of the family's property) were later lost at sea.

After years of farming, mainly at Pigeon Bay on the Banks Peninsula in the Canterbury region of the South Island, she decided to relocate to Canada. She later bought additional lands at Hanapepe and Makaweli on the island of Kauai. Her descendants, the Robinson family, continue to own and maintain the island of Ni'ihau.

Early life 

Elizabeth Sinclair was born in Glasgow, Scotland, on 26 April 1800.  Known as "Eliza", she was one of six children born to William (or James) a successful merchant, and Jean Robertson McHutcheson (sometimes spelled "McHutchison").  Eliza married Captain Francis W. Sinclair (1797–1846) of the Royal Navy on 13 January 1824.  They had three sons and three daughters.  Sinclair was considered a master navigator, best known for saving the life of the Duke of Wellington in rough seas while escorting him on his return from the Battle of Waterloo in 1815.

New Zealand

The Sinclairs moved to New Zealand, arriving in 1841; they settled in Pigeon Bay in 1843.  Eliza's husband and her oldest son George disappeared at sea in 1846 during a business trip headed towards Wellington.  Her husband was carrying all the family's cash and produce supplies.  After the disappearance of her husband, Eliza and her five children were left to survive on their own in Pigeon Bay.  With her children marrying and producing grandchildren, the Sinclair clan needed more land, and Eliza's son Francis helped plan a new voyage towards that end.  They sold their property in New Zealand and sailed to the Pacific Northwest of the United States with the goal of acquiring property in British Columbia.

Pacific Northwest

In early June 1863, the Bessie arrived in Victoria, British Columbia on Vancouver Island.  The Sinclairs found the land wild and undeveloped with thick forests, making the effort required to clear land for agriculture close to impossible with their limited labor and resources. Eliza set her sights on California, but an acquaintance named Henry Rhodes recommended that they avoid the rough oceans during the winter as it would make anchorage difficult.  Rhodes suggested that they sail to the Sandwich Islands (Hawaii) instead, since his brother lived in Honolulu.  The Sinclairs agreed, and they boarded the Bessie one last time.

Hawaii

At the age of 63 years, Eliza led 13 members of her family to Hawaii, arriving in Honolulu Harbor on 17 September 1863 on the vessel Bessie captained by her son-in-law, Thomas Gay.  The 300-ton barque arrived fully provisioned, with Merino sheep, one cow, hay, grain, chickens, a grand piano, books, and clothing. Eliza was considered a "chiefess" by the native Hawaiians she and her family employed on the island of Niihau and in Makaweli on Kauai.

In 1885, her niece Isabella McHutcheson Sinclair, who married Eliza's son Francis, authored and illustrated Indigenous Flowers of the Hawaiian Islands which has become an important record of the Hawaiian flora. The illustrations are of plants from Kauai and Niihau islands.

Descendants 
Her descendants continue to run the island under their private ownership.

Notes

References 

Bird, Isabella L. 1875. The Hawaiian Archipelago: Six Months Among the Palm Groves, Coral Reefs, and Volcanoes of the Sandwich Islands. London: John Murray.
Daws, Gavan, and Timothy Heap. 1962. . American Heritage 14, no. 6 (October): 48-51, 81-85. 
Dunford, Bruce. 2003. Seals, Boaters Threaten Niihau's Livelihood.  Los Angeles Times, 1 June.
Harrington, Daniel. Hawaiian Encyclopedia, s.v. "Biographies, Part 2 Glossary (M-S)". Mutual Publishing. (accessed 8 September 2018).
Holt, Ida Elizabeth Knudsen Von and Harold St. John. 2005. Stories of Long Ago: Niihau, Kauai, Oahu. Revised ed. N.p.: Daughters of Hawaii. . 
Joesting, Edward. 1987. Kauai: The Separate Kingdom. Honolulu: University of Hawaii Press. 
Keale, Sr. Moses, and Rerioterai Tava. 1990. Niihau: The Traditions of an Hawaiian Island. Honolulu: Mutual Pub Co. .
Laracy, Hugh. 2001. The Sinclairs of Pigeon Bay and the Romantic 'Prehistory' of the Robinsons of Niihau. Journal of Pacific History 36, no. 2 (September): 183-199.  
Novitz, Rosemary. Dictionary of New Zealand Biography, s.v. "Sinclair, Elizabeth - Biography". Te Ara - the Encyclopedia of New Zealand. (accessed 16 May 2012).
Peterson, Barbara Bennett, ed. 1984. Notable Women of Hawaii. Honolulu: University of Hawaii Press. .
Stepien, Edward R. 1988. Niihau: A Brief History. Working Paper series. Honolulu: Center for Pacific Islands Studies, School of Hawaiian, Asian, and Pacific Studies, University of Hawaii at Manoa. .
Tabrah, Ruth M. 1987. Niihau, the last Hawaiian island. Kailua: Booklines Hawaii Ltd. .
Wichman, Juliet Rice, and Harold St. John. 1994. A Chronicle and Flora of Niihau. Lawai: University of Hawaii Press. .

1800 births
1892 deaths
New Zealand farmers
New Zealand women farmers
Scottish emigrants to New Zealand
New Zealand horticulturists
Niihau
People from Hawaii
Scottish Calvinist and Reformed Christians
People from Kauai
19th-century New Zealand people
Ranchers from Hawaii
British expatriates in the Hawaiian Kingdom